Ashok Kumar Pincha is an Indian politician and was an elected member of Rajasthan Legislative Assembly representing Sardarshahar constituency as a member of Bharatiya Janata Party.

References 

Living people
Bharatiya Janata Party politicians from Rajasthan
Rajasthan MLAs 2008–2013
Year of birth missing (living people)